Artelys Knitro is a commercial software package for solving large scale nonlinear mathematical optimization problems.

KNITRO – (the original solver name) short for "Nonlinear Interior point Trust Region Optimization" (the "K" is silent) – was co-created by Richard Waltz, Jorge Nocedal, Todd Plantenga and Richard Byrd. It was first introduced in 2001, as a derivative of academic research at Northwestern University (through Ziena Optimization LLC), and has since been continually improved by developers at Artelys.

Optimization problems must be presented to Knitro in mathematical form, and should provide a way of computing function derivatives using sparse matrices (Knitro can compute derivatives approximation but in most cases providing the exact derivatives is beneficial). An often easier approach is to develop the optimization problem in an algebraic modeling language. The modeling environment computes function derivatives, and Knitro is called as a "solver" from within the environment.

Problem classes solved by Artelys Knitro

Knitro is specialized for nonlinear optimization but also solves a wide range of optimization problems:

 General nonlinear problems (NLP), including non-convex 
 Systems of nonlinear equations 
 Linear problems (LP) 
 Quadratic problems (QP/QCQP/SOCP), both convex and non-convex 
 Least squares problems / regression, both linear and nonlinear 
 Mathematical programs with complementarity constraints (MPCC/MPEC) 
 Mixed-integer nonlinear problems (MIP/MINLP) 
 Derivative-free optimization problems (DFO)

Algorithms

Artelys Knitro contains a wide range of optimization algorithms.

NonLinear Programming (NLP) solver
Knitro offers four different optimization algorithms for solving optimization problems. Two algorithms are of the interior point type, and two are of the active set type. These algorithms are known to have fundamentally different characteristics; for example, interior point methods follow a path through the interior of the feasible region while active set methods tend to stay at the boundaries. Knitro provides both types of algorithm for greater flexibility in solving problems, and allows crossover during the solution process from one algorithm to another. The code also provides a multistart option for promoting the computation of the global minimum.

 Interior/Direct algorithm
 Interior/Conjugate Gradient algorithm
 Active Set algorithm
 Sequential Quadratic Programming (SQP) algorithm

Mixed-Integer NonLinear Programming (MINLP) solver
Knitro provides tools for solving optimization models (both linear and nonlinear) with binary or integer variables. The Knitro mixed integer programming (MIP) code offers three algorithms for mixed-integer nonlinear programming (MINLP):

 Nonlinear Branch and Bound
 Quesada Grossman algorithm
 Mixed-Integer Sequential Quadratic Programming (MISQP)

Features
Artelys Knitro supports a variety of programming and modeling languages including.
 Object-oriented interfaces for C++, C#, Java and Python
 Matrix-oriented interfaces for Julia, C, Fortran, MATLAB, and R
 Links to modeling languages: AIMMS, AMPL, GAMS, JuMP and MPL
 Links to Excel through Frontline Solvers

Artelys Knitro also includes a number of key features:
 A large set of well-documented user options and automatic tuner
 (Parallel) multi-start for global optimization
 Derivatives approximation and checker
 Internal presolver

Supported platforms 
Artelys Knitro is available on the following platforms:
 Windows 64
 Linux 64
 MacOS 64
 ARM processors for embedded optimization

References

External links

 Jorge Nocedal, profile at EECS department of McCormick School of Engineering 

Numerical software
Mathematical optimization software